This is a list of Billboard magazine's Top Hot 100 songs of 1987.

See also
1987 in music
List of Billboard Hot 100 number-one singles of 1987
List of Billboard Hot 100 top-ten singles in 1987

References

1987 record charts
Billboard charts